Xylinepolis or Xylenopolis (meaning: wooden city/town) was a temporary military fortress (phrourion) in the naval base of Patala, founded in 325 BC by Alexander the Great.
It is mentioned by Pliny the Elder.
Nearchus (the admiral of Alexander) remained four months in the city before starting his voyage.

On the other hand, William Woodthorpe Tarn wrote that the town was a mistake at the transliteration of Pliny and in reality it was not built by Alexander but it was a native Indian place built of wood instead of brick.

See also
List of cities founded by Alexander the Great

References

 Memoir on the Eastern Branch of the River Indus, Giving an Account of the Alterations Produced on It by an Earthquake, Also a Theory of the Formation of the Runn, and Some Conjectures on the Route of Alexander the Great; Drawn up in the Years 1827-1828, Lieutenant Alex, pp 586-587

External links
Alexander the Great: his towns livius.org

Military history of ancient Greece
Cities founded by Alexander the Great